|

Ahmed Abukhater is an architect, environmental scientist, and an urban and regional planner by trade. He is an author, powerlifter, and the first athlete to represent Palestine at the World Association of Bench Pressers and Dead lifters (WABDL) World Powerlifting Championships in Las Vegas, Nevada, in 2006.

In November, 2007, Abukhater represented Palestine again in the WABDL World Championship, in Anaheim, California, where he won his division and set a new Palestinian world record.
He set a new record for the state of Illinois in 2004, and holds many national and international records in powerlifting.

International and world records 
Open and elite men's division -198 lbs weight class
 Set in official drug-tested competition 
 Squat: 630 lbs
 Bench Press: 610 lbs
 Deadlift: 705 lbs

Personal records 
Powerlifting Gym Records:
 Done in the gym (unofficial) 
 Squat: 705.4 lbs
 Bench Press: 727.5 lbs
 Deadlift: 749.5 lbs
 Powerlifting total: 2182 lbs 
He also bench pressed 413.3 lbs for 10 repetitions, touch and go in the gym.

Professional career 
Abukhater is currently working for Boeing in Digital Aviation. Previously, he served as senior director of GIS at Trimble Navigation Ltd, global director of product management at Pitney Bowes Software, Esri’s global industry manager for planning and community development and director of PLACES in California and a GIS manager and instructor at the University of Texas at Austin.

He is keynote speaker in a number of areas including GIS solutions and strategic marketing in Planning and Community Development, Urban and Regional Planning, environmental science and sustainable development, and trans-boundary water resources management and Conflict Resolution. His expertise is focused on the geopolitical and hydropolitical aspects of water resources in the context of the Arab-Israeli conflict, the transboundary management of water resources, and multinational environmental policies in the Middle East.

Early life 
Born in the Palestinian city of Rafah, Ahmed Abukhater grew up in a world of environmental inequity.
Being a native Palestinian from the Gaza Strip and raised during the Palestinian Intifada (uprising), he recognized the value of water as the sustainer of life and peace.

Abukhater holds a Ph.D. in community and regional planning from the University of Texas at Austin with a focus on water resources management and conflict resolution and mediation (alternative dispute resolution)  and a master's degree in urban and regional planning from the University of Illinois at Urbana-Champaign and a bachelor's degree in architectural engineering.

Specialization 
Through education and professional experience, he developed specialization in fields ranging from Planning Analysis and Geographic Information System (Esri), Geospatial analysis and multi-criteria evaluation (MCE), groundwater modeling, Environmental Science and Sustainable Development, to Conflict Resolution and Mediation. Abukhater has authored numerous publications, served on governing and advisory boards, and received over 20 awards for his work. His recent book entitled Water as a Catalyst for Peace - Transboundary Water Management and Conflict Resolution is a book that describes a water negotiation framework and provides an exposé of how equity can be linked into the process of international treaty negotiation and governance.

Publications 
 Palestine - Peace by Piece: Transformative Conflict Resolution for Land and Trans-boundary Water Resources, Springer International Publishing.
 Water as a Catalyst for Peace: Transboundary Water Management and Conflict Resolution, Taylor & Francis Group (Routledge).

References 

20th-century births
Living people
American geographers
Businesspeople in software
Environmental scientists
Palestinian powerlifters
American powerlifters
Palestinian emigrants to the United States
American business executives
21st-century American architects
American urban planners
National Geographic Society
Palestinian strength athletes
Palestinian sportspeople
University of Illinois School of Architecture alumni
University of Texas at Austin School of Architecture alumni
Year of birth missing (living people)